The North American Lutheran Church (NALC) is a Lutheran denomination with over 420 congregations in the United States, Canada, and Mexico, counting more than 142,000 baptized members. The NALC believes all doctrines should and must be judged by the teaching of the Christian Scriptures (the Bible), in keeping with the historic Lutheran Confessions. It was established on August 27, 2010. The group describes itself as embodying the "theological center of Lutheranism in North America," noting that it stands between the more liberal Evangelical Lutheran Church in America (ELCA) and the more conservative Lutheran Church–Missouri Synod (LCMS) and other Lutheran church bodies in North America, "firmly within the global Lutheran mainstream".

History
The North American Lutheran Church was officially formed in August 2010 as the culmination of a process begun by Lutheran CORE (Coalition for Renewal), an organization which crosses Lutheran denominational lines. This action came in response to the dissatisfaction of theological conservatives within ELCA and the Evangelical Lutheran Church in Canada (ELCIC) who perceived those bodies as moving away from the authority of the Bible and the Lutheran Confessions. The primary issue of concern for these groups was a 2009 decision by the ELCA which changed its teaching and policy on sexual ethics, allowing clergy / ministers to be in committed same-sex relationships. Following Lutheran CORE's national convocation in September 2009, which resolved to pursue the "reconfiguration of North American Lutheranism", the organization's leaders released a plan for organizing the North American Lutheran Church on February 18, 2010. It was felt that a new church body was needed for those Lutheran congregations who declined to join already existing conservative Lutheran groups.

The new church was constituted in Grove City, Ohio, at the Lutheran CORE national convocation of August 26–27, 2010. The convocation was attended by approximately 1,000 participants, including representatives of several conservative American or international denominations, such as the Lutheran Congregations in Mission for Christ, the Ethiopian Evangelical Church Mekane Yesus, the Evangelical Lutheran Church in Tanzania, and the Anglican Church in North America. A constitution was adopted and provisional leaders were elected, including retired ELCA bishop Paull Spring of State College, Pennsylvania, to serve as provisional bishop of the NALC for its first year. The congregations that joined the NALC elected their own leaders at the church body's first annual meeting on August 11–12, 2011, at Upper Arlington Lutheran Church in Hilliard, Ohio. NALC General Secretary John Bradosky of Centerville, Ohio, was elected as bishop of the NALC at that meeting to serve a four-year term. During the NALC's 2015 Annual Convocation in Dallas, Texas, he was re-elected to a second four-year term. In 2018, Bradosky announced his intention to retire at the end of his second term. On August 9, 2019, Dan Selbo, pastor of St. Timothy's Lutheran Church in San Jose, California, was elected and installed as the third bishop of the NALC.

Beliefs
The North American Lutheran Church understands itself to be part of the one holy, catholic, and apostolic church and holds that the Scriptures are the highest standard by which doctrine and practice are to be judged. It accepts the ecumenical creeds and the Lutheran Confessions as "true witnesses to the Word of God".

Core values
The North American Lutheran Church holds to four core values that shape its identity and church life:

 Christ Centered: "We confess the apostolic faith in Jesus Christ according to the Holy Scriptures. We affirm the authority of the Scriptures as the authoritative source and norm, 'according to which all doctrines should and must be judged' (Formula of Concord). We accept the ecumenical creeds and the Lutheran Confessions as true witnesses to the Word of God."
 Mission Driven: "We believe that the mission of the Church is to preach the Gospel and to make disciples for Christ. We believe that making disciples — in our congregations, in our communities and nations, and around the world — must be a priority of the Church in the present age."
 Traditionally Grounded: "We affirm the ecumenical creeds and the faithful witness of the Church across time and space. We endorse the form and practices of the universal Church that are consistent with Scripture, particularly the office of the ministry and the tradition of worship under Word and Sacrament. We seek dialogue and fellowship with other Lutheran churches and with faithful Christians of other confessions."
 Congregationally Focused: "We strive to be a church that is organized to facilitate the ministries of local congregations in a posture of servanthood and a spirit of partnership, through the provision of resources, connections and information."

Doctrine
The North American Lutheran Church ordains "qualified persons, both men and women", to the ordained ministry of Word and Sacrament. Men and women are able to serve in every office of the church, including that of bishop.

The Joint Commission on Theology and Doctrine of the NALC and Lutheran CORE endorsed a anti-abortion stance on abortion in the document "The Lord Is with You" – A Word of Counsel to the Church – The Sanctity of Nascent Life", on December 14, 2012. The North American Lutheran Church became associated with Lutherans For Life, the anti-abortion ministry of the LCMS, for the promotion of anti-abortion activism.

The North American Lutheran Church officially disapproves of homosexual relationships and same-sex marriage. Bishop Bradosky joined other religious leaders in the open letter, "Marriage and Religious Freedom: Fundamental Goods That Stand or Fall Together – An Open Letter from Religious Leaders in the United States to All Americans", released on January 12, 2012, on his support for the protection of marriage as the union between a man and a woman and in opposition to same-sex marriage. He was also one of the American religious leaders who signed the open letter "Free Exercise on Religion: Putting Beliefs into Practice", expressing his support for the Roman Catholic Church in its opposition to the HHS mandate.

Structure
The membership of the North American Lutheran Church is composed of congregations and ordained pastors who have subscribed to the NALC constitution. Provided that member congregations' beliefs and practices are compatible with the NALC, congregations can simultaneously affiliate with other Lutheran church bodies. Ministers and elected lay delegates represent their congregations in the annual convocation. This body elects the bishop, executive council, and other leadership positions. It also approves budgetary items and teaching statements. Certain actions of the convocation, such as constitutional amendments and teaching statements, must first be ratified by a majority or, in some cases, a two-thirds majority of NALC congregations before they take effect. The North American Lutheran Church is divided into 28 mission districts, usually based on geographical groupings of congregations. Regional deans, who may also serve as pastors of local congregations, work with the bishop to provide oversight and pastoral care to pastors and congregations within their mission districts.

The bishop is an ordained minister elected by the convocation. The bishop serves as "pastor for the pastors and congregations of the NALC" and as the church's chief executive officer. Together with the executive council, the bishop authorizes all ordinations and conducts the rite of ordination. The bishop serves for a four-year term and is eligible to serve for a maximum of three consecutive terms. The general secretary is appointed by the bishop and confirmed by the executive council. This officer manages the day-to-day administrative functions of the NALC. The executive council consists of the bishop, four clergy and four lay members. Its duties include implementing the work and policies of the NALC in between sessions of convocation, and its actions are subject to review by the convocation.

A seven-member Court of Adjudication, elected by the annual convocation, has jurisdiction to decide appeals of church disciplinary actions and has authority to interpret church governing documents. The convocation can overturn the court's interpretation of a governing document by amending the document in question.

Bishops
 Paull Spring (provisional) (2010–2011)
 John Bradosky (2011–2019)
 Dan Selbo (2019–present)

Mission districts
The North American Lutheran Church is divided into the following 28 Mission Districts:

 Atlantic Mission District
 Canada Mission District
 Caribbean and Hispanic Mission District
 Carolinas Mission District
 Central Pacific Mission District
 Eastern South Dakota Mission District
 Great Rivers Mission District
 Heartland Mission District
 Iowa Mission District
 Michigan Mission District
 Mid-Northeast Mission District
 Mid-South Mission District
 Minkota Mission District
 Northwest Mission District
 Ohio Mission Region
 North West Ohio Mission District
 South West Ohio Mission District
 North Central Ohio Mission District
 North East Ohio Mission District
 South East Ohio Mission District
 Rocky Mountain Mission District
 Sonshine Mission District of Florida
 Texas Mission Region
 North Texas Mission District
 Southeast Texas Mission District
 Southwest Texas Mission District
 Southwest Pacific Mission District
 Virginia Mission District
 Western Dakotas, Montana and Wyoming Mission District
 Wisconsin and Upper Michigan Mission District

Relations with other churches
The NALC Convocation, held in August 2011, approved unanimously the establishment of a full communion relationship with the Ethiopian Evangelical Church Mekane Yesus. A "Memorandum of Understanding" between the NALC and the Evangelical Lutheran Church in Tanzania was approved at the Convocation held at August 2013, paving the way for full communion between the two churches.

The NALC has established ecumenical dialogue with other Lutheran church bodies, such as the Lutheran Church–Missouri Synod, the Lutheran Church-Canada, and the Lutheran Congregations in Mission for Christ, as well as with the Roman Catholic Church, the Anglican Church in North America (ACNA), and the Eastern Orthodox Churches. The NALC passed a request to the Anglican Church in North America to share clergy where there were vacancies, which was accepted. In 2017, the ecumenical consultation of the ACNA and the NALC developed "Four Pastoral and Educational Affirmations" on "Baptism," "Holy Communion," "Holy Scripture," and "Jesus Christ, Gospel, and Justification." The NALC also started a seminary system called the North American Lutheran Seminary on the campus of Trinity School for Ministry, a seminary with ties to the Anglican Church in North America.

The NALC held an ecumenical summit with representatives of the ACNA, the LCMS, and the LCC on May 3–5, 2013, at the Church of the Holy Communion in Dallas, Texas, on the theme of "Biblical Teaching on Marriage and Sexuality". The summit issued the joint document "An Affirmation of Marriage", signed by representatives of all the four church bodies, which defined the institution of marriage as the unity between a man and a woman.

At its 2012 Convocation, the NALC approved, by the required majority of two thirds of the voters, a resolution to seek membership in the Lutheran World Federation. The application request was not approved by the LWF, remaining in a pending decision, according to a letter issued at May 2014, despite the support of the Lutheran Churches of Ethiopia and Tanzania. The NALC is considering possible associate membership in the International Lutheran Council.

In 2015, the NALC met with leaders of Lutheran churches from over a dozen nations around the world for a gathering which would later be called the Global Confessional and Missional Lutheran Forum (Global Forum). In September 2018, the Global Forum met again in Bishoftu, Ethiopia, and on Reformation Day (October 31), they released a letter to the Lutheran worldwide community of churches, referred to as the “Bishoftu Letter to the Churches.” The forum referred to this letter as "a summary and clarification of the teachings that are our biblical and confessional heritage" and "an invitation to Lutherans worldwide to confess, repent, be renewed, reformed and refocused by the Word of God, that together we may be a witness to the world, bringing others to Jesus Christ as Lord and Savior". The letter also serves as a response to "certain errors that have recently arisen among and within certain churches of the Lutheran confession".

References

External links
 

 
Lutheran denominations in North America
2010 establishments in Ohio
Christian organizations established in 2010
Global Confessional and Missional Lutheran Forum members